Insaaf Kaun Karega is a 1984 Indian action film directed by Sudarsan Nag and written by K. C. Bokadia. It stars Dharmendra, Rajinikanth, Jaya Prada and Madhavi.

Plot
Jageera Singh has always lived a life of crime, drinking alcohol and frequenting brothels, even though he is married to pregnant Laxmi, and has a son named Vikram. On the day of Laxmi's delivery, Jageera is busy molesting young Paro. Laxmi gives birth to a daughter, Jyoti, who is subsequently abducted. Jageera disappears from Laxmi's life, and she goes to live with a female friend who passes away, leaving Laxmi with the responsibility of also looking after her son, Virendra alias Veeru. Years later Jageera surfaces and joins forces with smuggler and prominent citizen, Bhanupratap. When Police Inspector Vikram's diligence causes problems for Bhanupratap, Jageera offers to kill Vikram, especially when Bhanupratap's niece, Priya, falls in love and wants to marry Vikram. It is at this point that the past will re-visit Jageera where he will come face to face with his past wrong actions and the devastation that he has inflicted on his family.

Cast
Dharmendra as Veerendra "Veeru"
Rajinikanth as Inspector Vikram Singh
Jaya Prada as Jyoti / Sitara
Madhavi as Priya
Shakti Kapoor as Paltu
Amrish Puri as Bhanupratap
Pran as Jagira
Bindu as Chand Bai
Rohini Hattangadi as Laxmi 
Gulshan Grover as Baggad
Sarla Yeolekar as Parvati "Paro"
Vikas Anand as Parvati's brother
Bob Christo as Bob
Jack Gaud as Lal Singh
 Raja Duggal as Haria

Music
"Tujhe Dekhe Bina Dil Nahi Mane" - Shabbir Kumar, Kavita Krishnamurthy
"Maharabaanon Ko Meraa Salaam Aakhari" - Anuradha Paudwal
"Insaaf Kaun Karega" - Mohammed Aziz
"Ikrar Kare Kis Se" - Anuradha Paudwal
"Hathkadiyaan Pehnoongi" - Kavita Krishnamurthy
"Mujre Ki Shaam Aakhri" - Anuradha Paudwal

References

External links 
 

1987 films
1980s Hindi-language films
Films scored by Laxmikant–Pyarelal